Kathleen Vaughan was a British actress.

Selected filmography
 The Old Country (1921)
 Single Life (1921)
 Handy Andy (1921)
 Corinthian Jack (1921)
 The Prince and the Beggarmaid (1921)
 Belphegor the Mountebank (1921)
 The Adventures of Mr. Pickwick (1921)
 The Crimson Circle (1922)
 Hornet's Nest (1923)
 The Last Hour (1930)

References

External links
 

Year of birth unknown
Year of death unknown
British film actresses
British silent film actresses
20th-century British actresses